The 2014 NCAA Division I FCS football season, part of college football in the United States, was organized by the National Collegiate Athletic Association (NCAA) at the Division I Football Championship Subdivision (FCS) level. The season began on August 23, 2014, and concluded with the 2015 NCAA Division I Football Championship Game played on January 10, 2015, at Toyota Stadium in Frisco, Texas.

Notable changes
Under a standard provision of NCAA rules, all FCS programs were allowed to play 12 regular-season games (not counting conference title games) in 2014. In years when the period starting with the Thursday before Labor Day and ending with the final Saturday in November contains 14 Saturdays, FCS programs may play 12 games instead of the regular 11. After this season, the next season in which 12-game seasons are allowed will be 2019.

Conference changes and new programs

Several teams changed conferences from the 2013 season, with all moves officially taking effect on July 1, 2014.

Other headlines
 May 14 – The NCAA announces its Academic Progress Rate (APR) sanctions for the 2014–15 school year. A total of 36 programs in 11 sports are declared ineligible for postseason play due to failure to meet the required APR benchmark, including the following seven FCS teams:
 Alabama State
 Arkansas–Pine Bluff
 Florida A&M
 Mississippi Valley State
 Prairie View A&M
 Saint Francis
 Savannah State
 In addition to the above teams, the entire athletic program at Southern, including the football team, is ineligible for postseason play due to failure to supply usable academic data to the NCAA.

FCS team wins over FBS teams
(FCS rankings from the Sports Network poll; FBS rankings from the AP Poll)

 August 30:
 No. 22 Bethune-Cookman 14, Florida International 12
 No. 2 North Dakota State 34, Iowa State 14
 September 6:
 Eastern Kentucky 17, Miami (OH) 10
 September 13:
 Abilene Christian 38, Troy 35
 Indiana State 27, Ball State 20—The Victory Bell Game
 September 20:
 Northwestern State 30, Louisiana Tech 27
 September 27:
 Yale 49, Army 43 OT
October 11:
 Liberty 55, Appalachian State 48 OT

FCS results by conference against FBS opponents

Conference standings

Conference summaries

Championship games

Other conference winners

Note: Records are regular-season only, and do not include playoff games.

Playoff qualifiers

Automatic berths for conference champions

At large qualifiers

Abstentions
Ivy League – Harvard
Southwestern Athletic Conference – Alcorn State

Postseason

NCAA Division I playoff bracket

* Home team    WinnerAll times in Eastern Standard Time (UTC−05:00)

Bowl games

Coaching changes

Preseason and in-season
This is restricted to coaching changes that took place on or after May 1, 2014. For coaching changes that occurred earlier in 2014, see 2013 NCAA Division I FCS end-of-season coaching changes.

End of season

See also
 2014 NCAA Division I FCS football rankings
 2014 NCAA Division I FBS football season
 2014 NCAA Division II football season
 2014 NCAA Division III football season

References